Charles John Baillie-Hamilton (4 January 1800 – 24 August 1865) was a British Conservative Party politician.

A member of the Baillie-Hamilton family headed by the Earl of Haddington, he was the son of the Venerable Charles Baillie, Archdeacon of Cleveland, son of the Honourable George Baillie, second son of Charles Hamilton, Lord Binning. His mother was Lady Charlotte, daughter of Alexander Home, 9th Earl of Home. Four of his brothers also gained distinction. Sir George Baillie was Ambassador to Tuscany; William Baillie-Hamilton and Cospatrick Baillie-Hamilton were both Admirals in the Royal Navy; and Ker Baillie-Hamilton was Governor of the Leeward Islands.

Baillie-Hamilton was elected as a Member of Parliament (MP) for Aylesbury at a by-election in July 1839, and held the seat until the 1847 general election, which he did not contest.  He stood for Parliament again at a by-election in December 1857 for Buckinghamshire, but did not win the seat.

He married Lady Caroline, daughter of Willoughby Bertie, 4th Earl of Abingdon, in 1821. They had several children. He died in August 1865, aged 65. Lady Caroline died in March 1870.

References

External links

1800 births
1865 deaths
Charles John
Conservative Party (UK) MPs for English constituencies
UK MPs 1837–1841
UK MPs 1841–1847